Nu Cassiopeiae, Latinized from ν Cassiopeiae, is a solitary star in the northern constellation of Cassiopeia. With an apparent visual magnitude of +4.89, it is a faint star but visible to the naked eye. Based upon an annual parallax shift of 7.92 mas as seen from Earth, this star is located around 410 light years from the Sun. Cowley et al. (1969) catalogued this star with a stellar classification of B9 III, indicating it has the spectrum of an evolved B-type giant star. However, Palmer et al. (1968) assigned it a class of B8 V, which would instead suggest it is an ordinary B-type main-sequence star.

References

B-type giants
Cassiopeiae, Nu
Cassiopeia (constellation)
Durchmusterung objects
Cassiopeiae, 25
004636
003801
0223